Amir Chūpān (died November 1327), also spelt Choban or Coban, was a Chupanid noble of the Ilkhanate, and nominal general of the Mongol Empire. He was ennobled by Emperor Taiding of Yuan as Duke of Yi (翊國公).

Background 
Chupan's father Malek participated in Siege of Baghdad while his uncle Akrunchi participated in a campaign in Georgia in 1318. His grandfather was Tudaun from the Suldus clan and was directly descended from Chilaun, who was one of Chingis Khan's four great companions. Tudaun accompanied Hulagu on his campaign against Golden Horde in 1262 and named as governor of Diyar Bakr, died in 1277 at the Battle of Elbistan.

Early career 
He participated in a battle against Nogai of Golden Horde in 1289 during his 20s. Amir Chupan was mentioned as a supporter of Gaykhatu during the latter's successful campaign for the Ilkhanid throne. During Ghazan's fight with Baydu for the throne in 1295, Chupan met with him near the Ustunavand castle and changed sides. He participated in a campaign against Sulaimish of Oirats, who rebelled in Anatolia in 1299. He acted as a senior commander during Ghazan's three campaigns against Syria, then under the rule of the Mamelukes. However, later, Chupan's army under the command of Ghazan's chief military officer Qutlugh Shah, was defeated by the Mamelukes in the battle of Marj al-Saffar (1303). When Qutlugh Shah fled, Chupan stayed with the army, and reached Ghazan in June. Ghazan, furious at the defeat, punished both Qutlugh Shah and Chupan, though the latter was dealt with more leniently. He also met Zahid Gilani sometime during reign of Ghazan.

Under Öljeitü 
On 19 March 1305 Chupan was betrothed to the daughter of Ghazan's successor Öljeitü, Dowlandi Khatun. In 1307 he was given command of one of four armies assigned to quell the rebellious province of Gilan. Marching from Ardabil, he convinced the rulers of Astara and Gaskar to surrender peacefully, and then met up with Öljeitü. Qutlugh Shah's army, however, did not fare so well, and he was killed by the Gilakis. Following his death, Öljeitü made Chupan his chief military commander or Amir of the Ulus (nation). This was followed by his marriage to his fiancée Dowlandi on 30 September 1307. Chupan was now a major influence behind the throne, though he had to contend with the court viziers. Dowlandi died in 1314, following death of Öljeitü in 1316, his son Abu Sa'id confirmed Chupan's status as Amir of the Ulus, despite attempts by the Amir Sevinch to gain the position for himself. Moreover, was betrothed to Sati Beg, another daughter of Öljeitü in 1317.

Height and fall under Abu Sa'id
Chupan attempted to neutralize the influence of the viziers. In 1318, he convinced the discredited former vizier Rashid-al-Din Hamadani to return to the Ilkhanid court. Rashid, who had many enemies, was accused of poisoning Öljeitü soon after he returned. Chupan promptly turned on him, and Rashid-al-Din was put to death in July of that year.

In 1319, armies under the command of the khan of the Blue Horde, Öz-Beg, invaded the Ilkhanate. Abu Sa'id led a campaign to stop the invasion. Chupan was on his way to assist Amir Husain (the father of the founder of the Jalayirids, Hasan Buzurg) against the raids of the Chagatai prince Yasa'ur, who was devastating Khurasan, but then turned around to support Abu Sa'id upon receiving word that the latter's position across the Kur River was in danger. Several of Abu Sa'id's officers had deserted, leaving his army weakened. He rushed to his master's position, only to find the troops of the Blue Horde already in flight. Nevertheless, Chupan inflicted heavy casualties upon the enemy.

The matter of Abu Sa'id's officers fleeing still needed to be addressed. When the amir enacted punishment against Qurumushi (also a potential rival), as well as several other officers, for their military negligence, a conspiracy was then launched against him. The conspirators included Abu Sa'id's uncle Irinjin, who Chupan had dismissed from the governorship of Diyarbakr. Irinjin was defeated near Mianeh in June 1319. Following these events, Chupan gained almost complete influence over the Ilkhan, and his sons gained prominent positions as the Ilkhanate was parceled out between them. His sons Timurtash, Shaikh Mahmud, Hasan and Demasq Kaja were given governorships of Anatolia, Georgia, Khorasan and Azerbaijan respectively. He also married Abu Sa'id's sister Sati Beg, whom he had been betrothed to since 1316.

However, his son Timurtash rose in rebellion in 1322, claiming to be Mahdi. Chupan went to obtain his surrender personally and even managed to get reappointment to the post by Abu Sa'id. Abu Sa'id sometime fell in love with Baghdad Khatun, one of emir Chupan's daughters. The emir's efforts to keep Abu Sa'id from marrying his daughter, who was still married to Hasan Buzurg (another powerful kingmaker of the era), did not help the situation. Abu Said approached Chupan in 1325, claiming her unsuccessfully. Chupan sent his daughter and son-in-law to Karabakh instead while himself went against Özbeg and Tarmashirin who invaded Azerbaijan and Khorasan respectively. Same year Chupan defeated another force led by Özbeg, and even invaded the Blue Horde.

As Chupan had reached the height of his power, he had also sown the seeds of his fall. While Abu Sa'id lacked a treasury, Chupan's son and administrative representative Demasq Kaja spent his wealth extravagantly. This situation annoyed the Ilkhan, who was further influenced against him by his viziers, particularly Rukn al-Din Sa'in, Chupan's own protégé. Chupan's efforts to keep Abu Sa'id from marrying his daughter Bagdad Katun, who was already married to Hasan Buzurg, did not help the situation.

Early in 1326, Chupan led an army to defend against an imminent invasion of Khurasan. By the request of Abu Said, the Khagan Yesün Temür awarded his custodian Chupan the nominal title of a chief-commander of all Mongol Khanates. In the autumn of that year, the Chagatai Khan Tarmashirin crossed the Oxus River, and was defeated by Chupan's son Hasan near Ghazna. The vizier Rukn al-Din Sa'in had traveled with Chupan, leaving Demasq Kaja in effective control at the Ilkhanid court. It was at this time that Abu Sa'id decided to make his move. Using opportunity, on 25 August 1327, Abu Sa'id had one of Chupan's sons, Demasq Kaja, killed, apparently for his activities with a former concubine of Öljaitü's.

Hearing this, Chupan marched against Abu Sa'id seeking revenge. he convinced the local religious leader of Simnan, Shaikh 'Ala' al-Daula, to try to negotiate a truce, and then camped near Qazvin. When the shaikh failed, he continued west, with his troops pillaging on the way. Upon reaching Quha, he was a day's journey away from Abu Sa'id's camp, but as night fell, most of his army including Muhammad Beg, uncle of Abu Sa'id deserted him near Ray, taking 30.000 soldier with them, leaving Chupan no choice but to retreat to Herat. Upon reaching Saveh, he sent his wife Sati Beg back to Abu Sa'id. He then traveled in the direction of Tabas, with the intention of finding refuge in Transoxiana. Upon reaching the Murghab River, he changed his mind and headed for Khurasan. He was given a friendly welcome into Herat by the local Kartid ruler, Ghiyath ud-Din. However he was soon strangled to death under orders of Abu Sa'id in 1327. Chupan and his son Chilaun were both killed. As Chupan's friend, Ghiyath ordered that he be killed by strangulation, which was considered an honorable way to die. The Kartid leader then sent one of Chupan's fingers to Abu Sa'id as proof of the deed. Many of Chupan's sons were to also die in the next few years. His daughter soon forced to divorce Hasan Buzurg and marry Abu Sa'id. In compensation, Hasan was awarded former post of Chupan, rising to be new commander-in-chief of Ilkhanid army.

He was buried in Medina, in the cemetery of Baqi, under the supervision of his daughter Bagdad Katun.

Personality 
Chupan was described as a devout Muslim who was also against among emirs who opposed Öljeitü's conversion to Shiism. Described by various sources as brave and just, he was also known to sponsor a water canal to Mecca in 1325. Being a fervent Muslim, he also oversaw reconstruction of mosques in Tabriz as well as demolition of churches. Nevertheless, he also protected Mar Yahballaha III.

Children
He had at least 4 wives, by whom Chupanid dynasty descended. Most of his children were born by unknown spouses. He also named at least two of his sons after his ancestors Chilaun and Sorgan Shira:

With unknown wives:
Hasan — Viceroy of Khorasan and Mazandaran
Talish
Haji Beg
Quc Husayn
Timurtash — Viceroy of Anatolia
Hasan Kuchak
Malek Ashraf
Timurtash
Sultanbakht
Malek Ashtar
Misr Malek
Demasq Kaja — Representative of Chupan in court of Abu Sa'id, married to Tursan (or Tursin), daughter of Irinjin of Keraites
Dilshad Khatun
3 daughters
Shaikh Mahmud — Governor of Armenia and Georgia
Pir Husayn
3 sons
Bagdad Katun — Khatun of Abu Sa'id
 Dowlandi Katun (betrothal - 19 March 1305, married - 30 September 1307, died - 1314) — daughter of Öljeitü
 Chilaun
 Kurdujin Khatun — governess of Shiraz and Kirman, daughter of Mengü Timur and Abish Khatun:
 Siuksah
Yagi Basti
 Nowruz
 Sati Beg ( 1316–1345) — daughter of Öljeitü, later Il-Khan:
 Surgan

References

Sources 

Charles Melville and 'Abbas Zaryab. http://www.iranica.com/articles/search/searchpdf.isc?ReqStrPDFPath=/home1/iranica/articles/v5_articles/chobanids&OptStrLogFile=/home/iranica/public_html/logs/pdfdownload.html
J. A. Boyle (1968). The Cambridge History of Iran, Volume Five: The Saljuq and Mongol Periods. 

1327 deaths
Chobanids
Year of birth unknown
Burials at Jannat al-Baqī
Generals of the Ilkhanate